Craig Lingard (born 11 December 1977) is an English rugby league coach who is the head coach of the Batley Bulldogs in the Betfred Championship, and a former player.

He previously played for Batley Bulldogs in the Championship. Lingard has been head coach of the Bramley Buffaloes. He was assistant coach to John Kear at the Batley Bulldogs before taking on the top job at the Keighley Cougars in Betfred League 1.

Background
Lingard was born in Wakefield, West Yorkshire, England.

Playing career
Lingard played as an amateur with Sharlston Rovers before turning professional. His professional playing career was at Batley Bulldogs, where he played from 1998 to 2008. In a tribute to this record the club named one of the terraces at the Fox's Biscuits Stadium, the Craig Lingard Terrace.

Coaching career
After retiring from playing, Lingard joined the Bulldog's coaching team and also worked as part of the Bradford Bulls coaching staff before being appointed head coach of National Conference League team, Bramley Buffaloes, in 2012. After just one season at Bramley, Lingard left and rejoined Batley as assistant head coach to John Kear.

Lingard continued in his Batley role until the end of the 2016 season when he was appointed head coach at Keighley Cougars on a two year contract. Lingard's contract was extended for a third year but in May 2019 he was sacked by Keighley.
In the 2022 Championship season, Lingard guided Batley to the Million Pound Game.  Batley went on to be defeated by Leigh 44-12.

Outside rugby league
Lingard's involvement with rugby league has always been part-time and away from the game he was previously a prison officer. While head coach at Bramley, Lingard was a competitor on British gameshow Countdown.

References

External links

1977 births
Living people
Batley Bulldogs coaches
Batley Bulldogs players
Bramley Buffaloes coaches
British prison officers
English rugby league coaches
English rugby league players
Keighley Cougars coaches
Rugby league players from Wakefield
Rugby league fullbacks